Jean le Sellier (by 1471–1517) was a politician who was a Member (MP) of the Parliament of England for Tournai in 1512.

References

1470s births
1517 deaths
English MPs 1512–1514
16th-century French people
Politicians from Tournai
Year of birth uncertain